Paul Quinichette (May 17, 1916 – May 25, 1983) was an American jazz tenor saxophonist. He was known as the "Vice President" or "Vice Prez" for his emulation of the breathy style of Lester Young, whose nickname was "The President", or simply "Prez". Young called Quinichette "Lady Q".

Early life
Quinichette was born in Denver, Colorado, United States. He had clarinet and alto saxophone lessons as a child, before switching to tenor saxophone. Around the age of 13, he had informal lessons from Lester Young. Quinichette attended Denver University, transferred to Tennessee State College, and then returned to Denver University, from which he graduated in music. While in college he played with local bands, and during summer vacations he toured with Nat Towles and the trumpeter Lloyd Hunter.

Later life and career
Quinichette worked with Shorty Sherock in the late 1930s, and was then with Ernie Fields (1942), and Jay McShann (1942–43). He was with Johnny Otis on the West Coast from 1945 to 1947, then went to New York with Louis Jordan in 1947. In New York he played with various musicians before joining Count Basie in 1951. After two years with Basie, and buoyed by the success of his own recordings for EmArcy Records, Quinichette left to form his own band.

In the mid to late 1950s, Quinichette also accompanied vocalist Dinah Washington on EmArcy recordings, and played with Benny Goodman and Nat Pierce (both 1955), John Coltrane (1957), and Billie Holiday. In the following decade, poor health hindered his activities as a musician, and he took work as an electrical engineer. Although still restricted, he resumed performing in 1973. 

Quinichette died in New York City on May 25, 1983.

Playing style
Grove comments that "Quinichette's style displayed a sense of swing unequaled among those musicians who followed Young." Writing in 1959, critic John S. Wilson stated that, after leaving Basie, "Quinichette has inclined to a coarseness of tone and ideas and an attack that stems as much from the less palatable side of Illinois Jacquet as it does from Young."

Discography
The Vice Pres (Emarcy 1951–52)
Blow Your Horn (Brunswick, 1953) 
Moods (EmArcy, 1954)
The Kid From Denver (Dawn, 1956)
On the Sunny Side (Prestige, 1957)
Cattin' with Coltrane and Quinichette (Prestige, 1957 [1959]) with John Coltrane
The Chase Is On (Bethlehem, 1957) – with Charlie Rouse
For Basie (Prestige, 1957) - with Shad Collins, Freddie Green, Walter Page, Jo Jones and Nat Pierce 
Basie Reunion (Prestige, 1958) - with Buck Clayton, Shad Collins, Jack Washington, Freddie Green, Eddie Jones, Joe Jones, and Nat Pierce
Like Basie! (United Artists, 1959)
Prevue (Famous Door, 1974)

As sideman
With Gene Ammons
The Big Sound (Prestige, 1958)
Groove Blues (Prestige, 1958)
With Count Basie
The Count! (Clef, 1952 [1955])
Basie Jazz (Clef, 1952 [1954])
The Swinging Count! (Clef 1952 [1956])
Dance Session Album No. 2 (Clef, 1954)
With Bob Brookmeyer
Kansas City Revisited (United Artists, 1958)
With Billie Holiday
An Evening with Billie Holiday (Clef, 1953)
Lady Sings the Blues (Clef, 1956)
With Jay McShann
The Last of the Blue Devils (Atlantic, 1978)
With The Prestige All Stars
Wheelin' & Dealin' (Prestige, 1957) – with John Coltrane and Frank Wess
With Sarah Vaughan
Sarah Vaughan with Clifford Brown (EmArcy, 1954) – with Clifford Brown
With Eddie "Cleanhead" Vinson
Clean Head's Back in Town (Bethlehem, 1957)
With Mal Waldron
The Dealers (Prestige, 1964)
With Dinah Washington
Blazing Ballads (Mercury, 1952)
After Hours with Miss "D" (EmArcy, 1954)
With Webster Young
For Lady (Prestige, 1957)

See also
 Jazz royalty

References

External links
Paul Quinchette discography, by Michael Fitzgerald, October 2, 2011

1916 births
1983 deaths
Jazz tenor saxophonists
Count Basie Orchestra members
Musicians from Denver
20th-century American musicians
20th-century saxophonists
20th-century American male musicians
American male saxophonists